Mylothra mithra is a species of moth in the family Autostichidae. It is found in Iran.

References

Gozmány, L., 1963a: The family Symmocidae and the description of new taxa mainly from the Near East (Lepidoptera). Acta zoologica Academiae scientiarum hungaricae, 9 (1–2): 67–134.
Gozmány, L., 1965e: Ergebnisse der zoologischen Forschungen von Dr. Z. Kaszab in der Mongolei. 31. A new symmocid genus and species from Mongolia (Lepidoptera: Symmocidae). Annales historico-naturales Musei nationalis hungarici, 57: 423–424.

Moths described in 1963
Mylothra